Adibou (English: Adiboo) is an educational video gaming series first developed by Coktel Vision in the 1990s. The franchise expanded into comic books, music and television series (such as Adiboo Adventure (2009)). Titles in the series follow Adiboo, a young alien who teaches children about a variety of topics including nature, maths, and language. Most stories are set in the world of Celesta.

The series is divided into different categories based on target market: Adi for 10-14 year-olds, Adibou for 4-7 year-olds, and Adiboud'chou for 18 months-3 year-olds, and characters have different names in different regions. The name Adibou is derived from the French acronym ADI meaning Accompagnement Didacticiel Intelligent (English: Intelligent Accompaniment Tutorial). Adibou games are now supported by ScummVM's "Gob" engine.

The series was created by Roland Oskian, CEO of Coktel Vision and the brains behind the original Adibou concept as well as coordinator of the game's development; Manuelle Mauger, who managed the development of the content; Arnaud Delrue, responsible for the game's technical development; and finally, Joseph Kluytmans, who was responsible for the visual quality of the universe. The games were designed specifically to be applicable within a classroom context.

In October 2005, Coktel Studio was sold by Vivendi Universal Games International to French publisher Mindscape which itself closed in 2011. More than a dozen titles were published until 2009 when the series went dormant.

Following the closure of Mindscape, the IP rights to Adibou were sold to Ubisoft, and in 2020, French company Wiloki, a french educational start-up founded by the children of Adibou creator Roland Oskian, partnered with Ubisoft to revive the character. In May 2022, Wiloki released a brand new title titled Adibou: La Chanson d'Adibou for browser, iOS and Android under their partnership with Ubisoft.

The new version of the game is now available in French, English and German.

Titles 
This list is far from complete; there were dozens of titles in the series, some more documented than others.

TV series 
An animated series, aired on french channels France 5 and TiJi, each of the 40 episodes usually lasting around 5 minutes.

Critical reception 
Referring to AJ's World of Discovery, Feibel felt there were better run and jump games available  whereas Jeuxvideo argued that Adibou games were a good option for children but were too short. The Argus praised the series for its music but criticised its "daft" title. PC Mag praised Adiboo: Discover Nature, Animals & Planets for offering educational content and "hours of entertainment".

By 1997, the series had sold over 1.5 million copies. Today, the series is inactive and little in-depth information exists online apart from a few Let's Play series and articles.

References

External links 
 Le site des anciennes revues informatiques - www.abandonware-magazines.org
 Retro Gamer 3/2019
 Adiboo - Rekenen

Educational video games
Video games developed in France
Coktel Vision games
Children's educational video games